St. Croix Falls is a city in Polk County, Wisconsin, United States. The population was 2,208 at the 2020 census. The city is located within the Town of St. Croix Falls.

U.S. Route 8, Wisconsin Highway 35, and Wisconsin Highway 87 are three of the main arterial routes in the city.

History 

In the 1840s the land that would become Saint Croix Falls was indirectly settled by Scandinavians and Germans. After the increase of logging, and the founding of the Cushing Land Company, Saint Croix Falls became incorporated in Wisconsin during 1887. The logging industry became important in St Croix falls, attracting New England immigrants which started a chain reaction of cutting down vast amounts of white pine. They were sent down the saint Croix river and the Mississippi river. From the late 1890s on the logging industry died down, the last log going down the Saint Croix log mill in 1914. This made St. Croix falls a more agricultural town. It officially became a city in 1958.

The Saint Croix Falls Dam was completed in the town in 1907 to generate hydroelectricity for Minneapolis, Minnesota, impounding the river's natural falls.

Geography
St. Croix Falls is located at  (45.411956, -92.638916).

St. Croix Falls is adjacent to Taylors Falls, Minnesota, across The St. Croix River.

Demographics

2020 census
As of the census of 2020, the population was 2,208. The racial makeup of the city was 93.5% White, 0.9% Asian, 0.5% Black or African American, 0.4% Native American, 0.9% from other races, and 3.9% from two or more races. Ethnically, the population was 1.9% Hispanic or Latino of any race.

2010 census
As of the census of 2010, there were 2,133 people, 967 households, and 522 families residing in the city. The racial makeup of the city was 96.7% White, 0.3% African American, 0.5% Native American, 0.6% Asian, 0.4% from other races, and 1.5% from two or more races. Hispanic or Latino of any race were 1.8% of the population.

There were 967 households, of which 26.0% had children under the age of 18 living with them, 39.1% were married couples living together, 11.2% had a female householder with no husband present, 3.7% had a male householder with no wife present, and 46.0% were non-families. 40.2% of all households were made up of individuals, and 18.8% had someone living alone who was 65 years of age or older. The average household size was 2.14 and the average family size was 2.87.

The median age in the city was 44.3 years. 22.1% of residents were under the age of 18; 7% were between the ages of 18 and 24; 22% were from 25 to 44; 27.1% were from 45 to 64; and 21.8% were 65 years of age or older. The gender makeup of the city was 44.9% male and 55.1% female.

2000 census
As of the census of 2000, there were 2,033 people, 872 households, and 504 families living in the city. The population density was 607.1 people per square mile (234.3/km2). There were 926 housing units at an average density of 276.5 per square mile (106.7/km2). The racial makeup of the city was 98.43% White, 0.05% Black or African American, 0.30% Native American, 0.20% Asian, 0.54% from other races, and 0.49% from two or more races. 1.33% of the population were Hispanic or Latino of any race.

There were 872 households, out of which 30.0% had children under the age of 18 living with them, 47.2% were married couples living together, 8.1% had a female householder with no husband present, and 42.1% were non-families. 36.8% of all households were made up of individuals, and 19.0% had someone living alone who was 65 years of age or older. The average household size was 2.22 and the average family size was 2.96.

In the city, the population was spread out, with 24.0% under the age of 18, 6.9% from 18 to 24, 26.1% from 25 to 44, 22.2% from 45 to 64, and 20.8% who were 65 years of age or older. The median age was 41 years. For every 100 females, there were 88.4 males. For every 100 females age 18 and over, there were 84.1 males.

The median income for a household in the city was $39,350, and the median income for a family was $54,063. Males had a median income of $40,185 versus $25,341 for females. The per capita income for the city was $21,384. About 2.9% of families and 5.8% of the population were below the poverty line, including 4.4% of those under age 18 and 10.9% of those age 65 or over.

Education
St. Croix Falls School District is the local school district. St. Croix Falls High School is the local high school.

Festivals 
Wannigan Days is a four day festival, held in St. Croix Falls, Wisconsin and Taylors Falls, Minnesota, meant as a celebration of the logging history of the saint Croix region.

Points of interest

St. Croix Falls abuts two parks whose focal points are the St. Croix River (Wisconsin-Minnesota).  It is home to the Park Headquarters for the St. Croix National Scenic Riverway, and it lies adjacent to the Interstate Park, a state park of Minnesota and Wisconsin that spans the Minnesota-Wisconsin state line along 
the St. Croix River Dalles with parts of the park on both sides.

St. Croix Falls is the western terminus of the Ice Age Trail and the Gandy Dancer State Trail.

The St. Croix Falls Dam was built over the city's namesake falls.

The Cushing Land Agency Building, Lamar Community Center and Thomas Henry Thompson House are located in St. Croix Falls.

St. Croix Dock is located in St. Croix Falls. People can rent kayaks and canoes to enjoy the St. Croix River.

Notable people

 Anders James Nelson, Ball State All American Middle Blocker

 Vernon A. Forbes, Oregon State Representative
 Donald L. Iverson, Wisconsin State Representative
 Megan Kalmoe, U.S. Olympian
 William R. Marshall, Governor of Minnesota
 James Henry McCourt, Wisconsin State Representative
 John Morgan, U.S. Navy Vice Admiral
 Roy Patterson, who played Major League Baseball for the Chicago White Sox from 1901 through 1907.
 James Breck Perkins, author, United States House of Representatives

See also
 List of cities in Wisconsin
1886 St. Croix River log jam

References

External links

 City of St. Croix Falls
 Falls Chamber of Commerce
 Sanborn fire insurance maps: 1885 1892 1899 1917

Cities in Wisconsin
Cities in Polk County, Wisconsin